The 2014 Chrono Champenois – Trophée Européen is the 25th running of the Chrono Champenois - Trophée Européen, a women's individual time trial bicycle race in France and was held on 14 September 2014 over a distance of . It was one of the few single time trial events on the 2014 women's cycling calendar and was the last test before the time trial at the 2014 UCI Road World Championships.

Halfway the  time trial Ellen van Dijk had a 39 seconds advantage over Hanna Solovey, but Van Dijk finished second 8 seconds behind her because she lost about a minute after riding the wrong direction.

Results

Source

See also

References

External links

Chrono Champenois - Trophée Européen
2014
Chrono Champenois - Trophée Européen